Albizia inundata is a perennial tree native to South America.  Common names include maloxo, muqum, paloflojo, timbo blanco, timbo-ata, and also "canafistula" though this usually refers Cassia fistula.

It grows to a height of up to 20 m. The leaves of Albizia inundata contain dimethyltryptamine, a hallucinogenic drug.

Synonyms
The synonymy of this species is quite confusing; related plants have been described by various authors under the same name as A. inundata. Junior synonyms of A. inundata are:

 Acacia inundata Mart.
 Acacia multiflora Spreng.
Acacia multiflora Kunth. is Albizia multiflora var. multiflora
 Acacia polyantha A.Spreng.
 Albizia polyantha (A.Spreng.) G.P.Lewis 
 Arthrosamanea polyantha (A.Spreng.) Burkart
 Arthrosamanea polycephala (Griseb.) Burkart
 Cathormion polyanthum (A.Spreng.) Burkart
 Cathormion polycephalum Burkart
Cathormion polycephalum (Griseb.) Burkart is Albizia polycephala
 Enterolobium polycephalum Griseb.
 Feuilleea polycephala (Griseb.) Kuntze
 Pithecellobium multiflorum (Kunth) Benth var. brevipedunculata Chodat & Hassl.
Pithecellobium multiflorum (Kunth) Benth is Albizia multiflora var. multiflora
Pithecellobium multiflorum Merr. is Archidendron merrillii
 Pithecellobium pendulum Lindm.

See also
Psychedelic plants

Footnotes

References
  (2005): Albizia berteriana (DC.) Fawc. & Rendle. Version 10.01, November 2005. Retrieved 2008-MAR-30.
  (2004): Enzyklopädie der psychoaktiven Pflanzen, Botanik, Ethnopharmakologie und Anwendungen (7th ed.). AT Verlag. 
  (2008): Provincia de Formosa - Biota: Resultados del Muestreo Observacional y Carta de Vegetación. Retrieved 2008-MAR-30.

External links

 Albizia inundata Photo (Field Museum) 
 Dried Herbarium Specimens (Field Museum)

inundata
Trees of South America